Delden is a railway station located in Delden, The Netherlands. The station was opened on 1 November 1865 and is located on the Zutphen–Glanerbeek railway between Zutphen and Hengelo. Train services are operated by Syntus.

Train services

Bus services

External links
NS website 
Dutch Public Transport journey planner 

Railway stations in Overijssel
Railway stations opened in 1865
Railway stations on the Staatslijn D
Hof van Twente